Dangme West District is a former district that was located in Greater Accra Region, Ghana. Originally created as an ordinary district assembly in 1988, which was created from the former Dangme District Council. However on 28 June 2012, it was split off into two new districts: Shai-Osudoku District (capital: Dodowa) and Ningo-Prampram District (capital: Prampram). The district assembly was located in the eastern part of Greater Accra Region and had Dodowa as its capital town.

See also
 Eleme

External links
 
 GhanaDistricts.com
 Towns In This District - GhanaDistricts.com

References

Districts of Greater Accra Region